At least two ships of the French Navy have been named Vauquelin: for Jean Vauquelin

 , a  launched in 1931 and scuttled in 1942
 , a  launched in 1955 and expended as a target in 2004

French Navy ship names